The Museum of Zoology of National Taiwan University (NTU) is a museum about zoology at the NTU main campus in Da'an District, Taipei, Taiwan.

History
The museum was originally established in 1928 during the Japanese rule. In the early days, recording of fauna in Taiwan and its neighboring areas such as Asia and Hainan was the major purpose of its collections. As time passed by, rodents and fishes became the main collection targets. In recent years, the collections expanded to include earthworms, bats, shrews, larval fishes etc.

Transportation
The museum is accessible within walking distance northeast from Gongguan Station of the Taipei Metro.

See also
 List of museums in Taiwan
 National Taiwan University

References

1928 establishments in Taiwan
Museums established in 1928
Zoology
National Taiwan University
Natural history museums in Taiwan
University museums in Taiwan
Zoology museums